Foreign players, also referred to as international players or imports, have taken part in various national or domestic sports leagues across the world. Some leagues impose player quotas to limit the number of foreigners on a team. A player may be considered as foreign depending on various factors not limited to their citizenship; such as their heritage, birthplace or residency.

Background
Generally foreign players in domestic leagues hold citizenship of a country other than that of the league. However other factors may come in play, that may classify a player as a foreigner for the purpose of league regulations.

This includes:
Birthplace
Heritage
Residency

Dual citizens, who holds one citizenship associated to the league they play in, may or may not be subject to player quota.

By sport

Association football
Most leagues in top leagues from Asian Football Confederation member countries impose a foreign player quota.

Basketball
In the National Basketball Association (NBA), an international player is someone who is born outside the United States. This excludes players who are born in US overseas military bases. 

In the Philippine Basketball Association (PBA), foreigners as well as naturalized Filipinos with no Filipino parents could only play as imports, a class of players subject to quota and can only take part in certain tournament or conference. Filipinos and Filipino-descended foreign nationals who are both born outside of the Philippines are considered Filipino-foreigners, who are likewise subject to a quota per team.

Advantage and disadvantage
The presence of foreign players are often argued to be to detriment of domestic players' development, and consequentially the national team. A counterpoint view, is that foreign players give opportunity to local players to be able to compete against international players outside of national team matches.

In the Chinese Super League, where high-profile foreign players often fetch higher transfer fees and salary, state-run media Xinhua criticized clubs that employ foreign reinforcements as "burning money".

References

Expatriate sports competitors